Aral Karakum is a desert in Kazakhstan, situated northeast of the Aral Sea. 

Most of the desert territory is located within the Aral and Kazaly districts of the Kyzylorda Region. A small sector is part of the southeastern end of the Aktobe Region and the southwestern fringes of the Karaganda Region.

Geography
The desert borders on the Syr Darya river to the south.

The area is very dry, and the dried-out riverbeds usually only carry water during springtime, when the winter snow melts. Lake Zhaksykylysh is located in the western part.

Climate
Winter lasts from mid-November to mid-March, with varying cloud cover and frequent fog. However, at any time during winter, mild weather is possible. Precipitation falls mostly in the winter as snow.

Summer lasts from May to mid-September. Daytime temperatures normally range , but temperatures up to  have been recorded. During summer, there are often dry winds and dust storms.

Flora
The Aral Karakum has some vegetation, mainly grasses, and it is being used for grazing of sheep.

References

Deserts of Central Asia
Deserts of Kazakhstan